Comadia redtenbacheri is a moth in the family Cossidae. It is found in North America, where it has been recorded from Mexico and southern Texas.

The moth was first named in 1848 by Austrian entomologist Carl Eduard Hammerschmidt (1800–1874) in honour of his colleague Ludwig Redtenbacher (1814–1876).

The length of the forewings is 12–14 mm for males and 13–16 mm for females. The forewings are brown with a narrow white strip from the wing base to near the apex. The hindwings are grey-brown. Females are generally paler than males. Adults have been recorded on wing from April to May and in September.

The larvae feed on the succulent leaves of the maguey (Agave americana) and green maguey (Agave salmiana). Young larvae are pale reddish, becoming carmine in later instars. The moth lays its eggs near the base of the Agave leaves.

In food and drink
In Spanish, the caterpillars are known as chilocuil, chinicuil, tecol, or gusanos rojos and have been traditionally used as food in Mexican cuisine. They are also commonly placed in bottles of mezcal, giving a unique color and flavor to the drink.

See also

Aegiale hesperiaris

References

External links
Natural History Museum Lepidoptera generic names catalog

Cossinae
Edible insects
Oaxacan cuisine
Moths of North America
Moths described in 1848